The 1937 Men's World Weightlifting Championships were held in Paris, France from September 10 to September 12, 1937. There were 50 men in action from 10 nations.

Medal summary

Medal table

References
Results (Sport 123)
Weightlifting World Championships Seniors Statistics

External links
International Weightlifting Federation

World Weightlifting Championships
World Weightlifting Championships
International weightlifting competitions hosted by France
World Weightlifting Championships